Le Moyne (also known as Ville Le Moyne, formerly known as LeMoyne) is a neighbourhood in Longueuil, Quebec, part of the borough of Le Vieux-Longueuil, and a former city. Le Moyne makes up 2% of the total area of Le Vieux-Longueuil borough and is the only neighbourhood of the borough that was not part of the pre-2002 city of Longueuil. Residents of Le Moyne are called Le Moynois.

The municipal electoral district of Le Moyne-Jacques-Cartier corresponds to the territory of Le Moyne, along with a portion from the former city of Longueuil.

History

Saint-Maxime and Saint-Josaphat
Le Moyne is divided into two sections separated by Route 112. They are Saint-Maxime and Saint-Josaphat, the two Catholic parishes that are the ancestors of Le Moyne.

Route 112 is called Saint-Louis Street in Saint-Maxime. Saint-Maxime has the shape of rectangle and is located from Saint-Louis Street to the limits of Greenfield Park. Saint-Maxime Church, built in 1918, is on Charron Street.

In Saint-Josaphat, Route 112 is called Sir Wilfrid-Laurier Boulevard. Saint-Josaphat has the shape somewhat of a boomerang or a hockey stick, and is located from Sir Wilfrid Laurier Boulevard to the limits of the former city of Longueuil. Saint-Josaphat Church is located on De L'Église Street.

Town of Le Moyne
The town of Le Moyne was created in 1949 from the merger of two parishes, Saint-Josaphat and Saint-Maxime, both of which were previously located in Ville Jacques-Cartier. According to local historian Michel Pratt, the name "Le Moyne" was chosen by Redmond Roche of the Union Nationale, in honour to Charles Le Moyne.

Le Moyne elected in 1981 Louise Gravel as its first female mayor.

Motto
The last of motto of Le Moyne, before its annexation into Longueuil, was Droit et Loyal (English translation: Right and Loyal)

Town hall
Up until 1967, the town hall of Le Moyne was on Saint-Louis Street near Laurier Street. When located there, Le Moyne had its own police and fire stations.

In 1967, the town hall was moved on Saint-Georges Street (corner Charron Street), where it remained until the 2002 merger of Le Moyne with Longueuil.  When Le Moyne moved its city hall in 1967, it did away with its police and fire services. From then on, these services were provided to Le Moyne, first by the city of Saint-Lambert, and later by the city of Saint-Hubert.

Today, the city hall on Saint-Georges Street has been converted as a fire station for the city of Longueuil.

Merger to Longueuil
On January 1, 2002, Le Moyne ceased to exist as a municipality and was amalgamated into the city of Longueuil to become part of the Saint-Lambert/Le Moyne borough.

However, on June 20, 2004 Saint-Lambert voted to demerge from Longueuil and on January 1, 2006 regained its status of city, while Le Moyne opted to stay in Longueuil.

After the demergers, Le Moyne joined Le Vieux-Longueuil borough following the results of a 2005 referendum in which the residents of Le Moyne were given the choice to pick a new borough between Le Vieux-Longueuil, Saint-Hubert and Greenfield Park.

Demographics

Mayors

Notable people
 Maxime Talbot, former NHL player

See also
 Michel Pratt, Histoire de la ville de Le Moyne 1949-1999, Société historique et culturelle du Marigot
 Boroughs of Longueuil
 List of mayors of Longueuil
 Longueuil City Council
 Longueuil
 Municipal reorganization in Quebec
 Urban Agglomeration of Longueuil
 Le Vieux-Longueuil

References

Former municipalities in Quebec
Neighbourhoods in Longueuil
Populated places established in 1949
Populated places disestablished in 2002